Corlier Aerodrome  is an altiport located  north-northwest of Corlier, a commune in the Ain department of the Auvergne-Rhône-Alpes region in eastern France.

Facilities

References 

Buildings and structures in Ain
Airports in Auvergne-Rhône-Alpes
Altiports